William Eugene Dickey (October 20, 1874 – May 13, 1944) was an American diver who competed in the 1904 Summer Olympics. At the 1904 Olympics he won a gold medal in a plunge for distance event.

References

External links
William Dickey's profile at databaseOlympics
William Dickey's profile at Sports Reference.com

1874 births
1944 deaths
Olympic gold medalists for the United States in diving
Divers at the 1904 Summer Olympics
American male divers
Burials at Arlington National Cemetery
Medalists at the 1904 Summer Olympics
19th-century American people
20th-century American people